The Bristol and District Football League is a football competition based in Bristol, England. The top division in this league, which is the Senior Division, sits at level 14 of the English football league system and is a feeder to the Bristol Premier Combination. This league has a total of six divisions.  In 2015–16, Chipping Sodbury Town Reserves won the Senior Division title. The league is affiliated to the Gloucestershire County FA.

The Bristol and Avon League feeds into the Bristol and District League.

History
The Bristol and District League was originally formed in 1892 on the suggestion of Gloucester City player Percy Stout, although Gloucester did not join the league until the following season. The league became known as the Western Football League in 1895, but the name Bristol and District League has been a familiar title in Bristol football in subsequent years.

Among the clubs that have left the Bristol and District League and now compete at a higher level are:
Bitton
Bristol St George (now known as Roman Glass St. George)
Cadbury Heath
Clevedon (now known as Clevedon Town)
Keynsham Town
Lawrence Weston Athletic (now known as Hallen)
Longwell Green Sports
Mangotsfield United
Oldland (now known as Oldland Abbotonians)
Winterbourne United
Yate YMCA (now known as Yate Town)

Member clubs 2015–16

Recent Champions

References

External links
 Bristol & District League page on FA Full-Time

 
Football leagues in England
Sports leagues established in 1892
1892 establishments in England
Football in Bristol